Jacob Benedict Lintott (born 22 April 1993) is an English cricketer. He made his Twenty20 cricket debut for Hampshire in the 2017 NatWest t20 Blast on 18 August 2017. He made his first-class debut on 11 July 2021, for Warwickshire in the 2021 County Championship. He was drafted by Southern Brave for the inaugural season of The Hundred. He was the highest wicket taker for Southern Brave with 11 wickets in 9 matches. In August 2021, he was signed by the Barbados Royals for 2021 Caribbean Premier League.

In April 2022, he was bought by the Southern Brave for the 2022 season of The Hundred. He made his List A debut on 14 July 2022, for the England Lions during South Africa's tour of England.

References

External links
 

1993 births
Living people
English cricketers
Hampshire cricketers
Gloucestershire cricketers
Sportspeople from Taunton
People educated at Queen's College, Taunton
Dorset cricketers
Wiltshire cricketers
Warwickshire cricketers
Southern Brave cricketers